A plasma receiver is an instrument capable of detecting the vibrations in outer space plasma.

It may have been Donald Gurnett, University of Iowa Professor of Physics, who invented the Plasma receiver. Gurnett has been intimately involved in the key space probes sent since 1962 (Ijun III, Voyager I and II, Galileo and Cassini–Huygens amongst others).

Vibrations in the audible frequency range are perceived by humans when air vibrates against their eardrum. Air, or some other vibrating medium such as water, is indispensable in the perception of sound by the human ear. Without it acting as a transmitter, the sound produced by the source will not be perceived by a human.
There is no air in outer space, nor there is any other type of medium capable of transmitting any vibration from a source to a human ear. However, there are sources in outer space that do vibrate at frequencies that would be audible by a human, if only there were some sort of transmitting media to carry those vibrations from the source to a human eardrum.

One such source, capable of vibrating at audible frequencies (45 to 20,000 vibrations per second) is plasma. Plasma is a collection of charged particles, such as free electrons or ionized gas atoms. Examples of plasma are solar flares, solar wind, neon signs and fluorescent lamps. Plasma interacts with electrical and magnetic fields in ways that can result in vibrations in many frequencies, including the audible range.

It appears that Gurnett designed the first plasma receiver, an instrument capable of detecting the vibrations in outer space plasma. These interplanetary plasma vibrations can be transformed into sound waves or air vibrations audible to a human ear. NASA provided recordings of these interplanetary and outer space plasma vibrations to composer Terry Riley and Kronos quartet founder David Harrington, which inspired the composition of "Sun Rings", a multimedia 85-minute piece for string quartet and choir. "Sun Rings" was performed November 3, 2006, at the Veteran's Auditorium, in Providence, Rhode Island.

See also
List of plasma (physics) articles

External links
 NASA page describing use of a plasma receiver

Plasma physics